The Chief Medical Officer is the principal health advisor to the Australian government. The position is a medical appointment, reporting to the Departmental secretary for the Department of Health.  The position is responsible for the Office of Health Protection which itself has responsibility for biosecurity, immunisation and disease surveillance. The position is also responsible for "maintaining high-quality relationships between the department, the medical profession, medical colleges, universities and other key stakeholders". Other responsibilities of the position vary according to the skills and background of the officeholder. The position was originally created in November 1982 because the newly appointed Director-General of Health was not a doctor. The position is an advisory in nature and does not have executive or operational authority.

, the Chief Medical Officer is Paul Kelly, succeeding Brendan Murphy who became Secretary of the Department of Health.

, the joint Deputy Chief Medical Officers are Nick Coatsworth, Ruth Vine and Michael Kidd.

In May 2020, psychiatrist Ruth Vine was appointed the first Deputy Chief Medical Officer for Mental health.

Previous officers include John Horvath in 2003, Jim Bishop in 2009, and Chris Baggoley from August 2011 until 2016. The role has recently been focused on immigration and related health issues, as well as the ongoing COVID-19 pandemic. The position is head of the Australian Health Protection Principal Committee and in that role an adviser to the National Cabinet of Australia, created in response to the pandemic.

Annual reports 

Separate printed reports from the officer were available before 2003; after that time they became incorporated into the departmental reports.

List of Chief Medical Officers
David de Souza (1983–1988)
Tony Adams (1988–1997)
Judith Whitworth (1997–1999)
Richard Smallwood (1999–2003)
John Horvath (2003–2009)
Jim Bishop (2009–2011)
Chris Baggoley (2011–2016)
Brendan Murphy (2016–2020)
Paul Kelly (2020–present)

Related roles and terminology

States and territories
Most of the principal health advisors in each state and territory bear the title Chief Health Officer (CHO), apart from South Australia (Chief Public Health Officer) and Tasmania (Chief Medical Officer). During the COVID-19 pandemic in Australia, the state CHOs became prominent as advisors regarding the state responses, and in particular closure of state borders. The CMOs/CHOs are part of the Australian Health Protection Principal Committee which advises the National Cabinet on health matters, which has been particularly important during the pandemic.

, the principal health advisors in each state and territory are:
Australian Capital Territory: Kerryn Coleman, CHO
New South Wales: Kerry Chant, CHO
Northern Territory: Hugh Heggie, CHO
Queensland:  John Gerrard, CHO
South Australia: Nicola Spurrier, Chief Public Health Officer  
Tasmania: Mark Veitch, Director of Public Health, Tony Lawler, Chief Medical Officer
Victoria: Brett Sutton, CHO
Western Australia: Andrew Robertson, CHO

In sport
Many of the major professional sports bodies in Australia, including the Australian Institute of Sport, appoint a Chief Medical Officer, usually a sport and exercise medicine physician, to advise on medical matters.

References

External links
Chief Medical Officer – Department of Health

Australia
Health in Australia
Australian public servants
People in public health